Abdirashid Ali Sharmarke (8 June 1919 – 15 October 1969), also known as Abdirashid Shermarke, was Prime Minister of Somali Republic from 12 July 1960, to 14 June 1964, and President of Somali Republic from 6 July 1967, until his assassination on October 15, 1969. He was the father of Somali Prime Minister Omar Abdirashid Ali Sharmarke.

Early years
Sharmarke was born in 1919 in the town of Harardhere in the north-central Mudug region of Somalia. His father hailed from the Majeerteen Osman Mohamoud clan and his mother from the Habar Gidir (Sacad Siciid) clan.

Raised in Mogadishu by his mother, Sharmarke attended Qur'anic schools and completed his elementary education in 1936. He then embarked on a career as a trader and later as a civil servant in the Italian colonial administration.

In 1943, the year of its inauguration, Sharmarke joined the incipient Somali Youth League political party. He entered the British administration's civil service the following year.

While still a civil servant, Sharmarke completed his secondary education in 1953. He earned a scholarship to study at the Sapienza University of Rome, where he obtained a BA in Political Science. In 1960, his son, Omar Abdirashid Ali Sharmarke, who would later become Prime Minister of the Somali Transitional Federal Government, was born.

Political career
After returning from his studies abroad in Italy in 1959, Sharmarke was elected to the Legislative Assembly.

On 26 June 1960, British Somaliland gained independence as the State of Somaliland. On 1 July 1960, the State of Somaliland and the Trust Territory of Somaliland (previously Italian Somaliland) united to form the Somali Republic. (The anniversaries of both events are now celebrated on the Independence Day of Somalia as a public holiday in Somaliland and Somalia). 

On 1 July 1960, with the creation of the Somali Republic, the then-incumbent President Aden Abdullah Osman Daar appointed Sharmarke Prime Minister of Somalia. Sharmarke's duties as Prime Minister saw him travel abroad extensively in pursuit of a non-aligned and neutral foreign policy. He remained Prime Minister until March 1964, when the first general elections were held and which saw him re-elected as a member of Parliament.

In the 1967 presidential elections, Sharmarke beat out Daar to become the second President of Somalia. He was sworn into office on July 6, 1967.

Assassination
In 1968, Sharmarke narrowly escaped an assassination attempt. A grenade exploded near the car that was transporting him back from the airport, but failed to kill him.

On 15 October 1969, while paying an official visit to the northern town of Las Anod, Sharmarke was shot dead by one of his own bodyguards. On duty outside the guest-house where the president was staying, the officer fired an automatic rifle at close range, instantly killing Sharmarke. Observers suggested that the assassination was inspired by personal rather than political motives.

Sharmarke's assassination was quickly followed by a military coup d'état on 21 October 1969 (the day after his funeral), in which the Somali Army seized power without encountering armed opposition; essentially a bloodless takeover. The putsch was spearheaded by Major General Mohamed Siad Barre, who at the time commanded the army.

See also
Omar Abdirashid Ali Sharmarke
Aden Abdullah Osman Daar
Haji Bashir Ismail Yusuf
Somali Youth League

Notes

References

  Mohamed Haji Ingiriis (2017) Who Assassinated the Somali President in October 1969? The Cold War, the Clan Connection, or the Coup d’État, African Security, 10:2, 131-154, DOI: 10.1080/19392206.2017.1305861 

1919 births
1969 deaths
1969 murders in Africa
20th-century prime ministers of Somalia
Assassinated heads of state
Assassinated Somalian politicians
Leaders ousted by a coup
Presidents of Somalia
People murdered in Somalia
Deaths by firearm in Somalia
Sapienza University of Rome alumni
Somali Youth League politicians
People from Mudug
Somali independence activists